Agastache pallidiflora, commonly known as New Mexico giant hyssop or Bill Williams Mountain giant hyssop, is a plant in the mint family. It is a perennial herb with semi-evergreen leaves.

Descrption

Leaves are simple and opposite in arrangement. It grows in moist canyons.

Uses
It is used by the Ramah Navajo as a ceremonial chant lotion, for bad coughs, and the dried, pulverized root used as dusting powder for sores or cankers. The Ramah also use it a fumigant for "deer infection", as a febrifuge, and to protect from witches.

References

pallidiflora
Endemic flora of the United States
Flora of Arizona
Flora of Colorado
Flora of New Mexico
Flora of Texas
Plants used in traditional Native American medicine
Taxa named by Amos Arthur Heller
Objects believed to protect from evil
Flora without expected TNC conservation status